The Chinese Ambassador to Zimbabwe is the official representative of the People's Republic of China to the Republic of Zimbabwe.

List of ambassadors

See also

China–Zimbabwe relations

References 

Zimbabwe
China
Ambassadors